Peter Kunter (born 28 April 1941 in Berlin, Germany) is a former professional football goalkeeper.

Playing for Eintracht Wetzlar, Kunter was capped for the German youth national team in 1958, amassing nine appearances. Afterwards he played four times for the amateur national team. From 1961 on, Kunter studied dentistry, sports and German studies in Freiburg while playing for second tier Freiburger FC. In 1965, he moved to Eintracht Frankfurt, amassing 234 Bundesliga games and 17 games in DFB-Pokal and UEFA Cup/Cup Winners Cup. In December 1969, he received a doctorate of dentistry. He played in the final of the first DFB-Pokal win of the eagles in 1974 against the Hamburger SV. The next time one year later against MSV Duisburg he was a substitute.

With 1.73 metres, Kunter was some inches too small to seriously compete with his rivals in the national team (Maier, Nigbur, Kleff, Franke) and never played for the senior national team.

Kunter retired in 1976. Between 1977 and 1979, he was vice chairman of Eintracht Frankfurt and from 2001 until 2005 he was a member of the clubs' administrative board.

References

1941 births
Living people
German dentists
German footballers
Eintracht Frankfurt players
Association football goalkeepers
Bundesliga players
Footballers from Berlin
Freiburger FC players